The 2010 Chatham Cup is New Zealand's 83rd knockout football competition.

The 2010 competition had a preliminary round, a qualification round, and four rounds proper before quarter-finals, semi-finals, and a final. In all, 135 teams took part in the 2010 competition.

Draw controversies
There were several problems with the draw of teams for specific ties in the 2010 Chatham Cup.

The neutrality of the allotment of teams to specific ties was drawn into question by some observers in the Second Round. A coincidence and a computer glitch combined to produce an "early draft" of the ties which included one of the fixtures later replicated in the live draw.

The third round also saw controversy when the draw had to be re-made. Initially, teams were not divided geographically for the Third Round draw, despite the competition rules stating that draws would remain regionally based until the fourth round, and some teams found themselves facing long trips which had not been budgeted for. This forced a re-draw and an apology from NZ Football.

Suspicions about the validity of the draw were not assuaged when the Quarter-Final draw resulted in four matches which tallied with the boundaries of New Zealand's three football regions, as would have been the case had the draw still been done on regional lines. This produced two Auckland derbies, one all-Wellington match, and one featuring the two remaining South Island teams.

The 2010 final
When the semi-final draw was made, it became apparent that a final between two non-Auckland area sides was possible. As a result, it was announced that if neither finalist was from Auckland, the final would be played in either Wellington or Dunedin. This did not eventuate, with Bay Olympic beating Caversham in the first semi-final to ensure that the final would be at North Harbour Stadium.

In the final, Rangers took an early lead through a Tim Schaeffers goal in the 12th minute, the goal coming after Olympic goalkeeper Danny Robinson parried a shot from Danny Cheriton which fell kindly for the Miramar defender. Campbell Parkin doubled the lead with a close-range effort from a corner in the twentieth minute. It was Parkin's second final, as he had played in the losing Dunedin Technical side in the 2008 final. Nathan Strom reduced the deficit with a 34th-minute header, and Bay olympic continued to push for the rest of the half and the first few minutes of the second spell. With fifteen minutes remaining, it was Miramar who gained their third however, with a run by Michael White through the Bay defence. Olympic had a chance to reduce the deficit shortly afterwards when an ill-timed challenge on Joe Edwards by Schaeffers gave them a penalty. Goalkeeper Phil Imray kept out Strom's spot kick, and the score remained 3–1.

The Jack Batty Memorial Cup is awarded to the player adjudged to have made to most positive impact in the Chatham Cup final. The winner of the 2010 Jack Batty Memorial Cup was Phil Imray of Miramar Rangers.

Results

Second round

* Won on penalties by Lower Hutt (4–2)

Third round

Fourth round

Quarter-finals

Semi-finals

Final

References

External links
 NZ Football 2010 Chatham Cup page
 NZ Football 2010 Chatham Cup full results

Chatham Cup
Chatham Cup
Chatham Cup
Chat